José Ovejero (born 1958) is a Spanish writer. He was born in Madrid but has lived outside Spain for the greater part of his life. He has worked in a variety of genres, including poetry, drama, essays, short stories and novels. He won the 2013 Premio Alfaguara for his novel La invención del amor (Inventing Love).

Biography 
José Ovejero was born in 1958 in Madrid. He studied Geography and History at University in Spain and then moved to the Faculty of Egyptology in Bonn. In 1988 he moved to Brussels, where he worked as an interpreter for the EU until 2001. He now lives mainly in Madrid.

His first published work was a collection of narrative poems on Henry Morton Stanley. Since then he has published nine novels and as well short stories, essays and more poetry. He has also experimented with travel writing and drama.

Ovejero believes that “literature allows us to deconstruct the apparent order of reality, and from there you can construct new orders or create different unities.” 

He has won several major literary prizes, including the 2013 Premio Alfaguara for his novel La invención del amor, translated into English as Inventing Love.

In 2018, José Ovejero presented three of his stories in a one-man stage show under the title ¡Qúe raros son los hombres! (Men Are So Strange!), touring theatres in Spain, Latin America, New York and various European cities - including London, as part of the Festival of Spanish Theatre (Festelón).

Bibliography

Novels 
1997   Añoranza del héroe (Nostagia for the Hero)

1999   Huir de Palermo (Fleeing Palermo)

2003   Un mal año para Miki (A Bad Year for Miki)

2005   Las vidas ajenas (Other People's Lives) Premio Primavera 2005

2007   Nunca pasa nada (Nothing Ever Happens)

2009   La comedia salvaje (The Wild Comedy)

2013   La invención del amor (Inventing Love) Premio Alfaguara 2013

2015   Los ángeles feroces (The Ferocious Angels)

2017   La seducción (The Seduction)

2019   Insurrección (Insurrection)

Poetry 
1994   Biografía del explorador (Biography of the Explorer)

2002   El estado de la nación (The State of the Nation)

2012   Nueva guía al Museo del Prado (New Guide to the Prado Museum)

2017   Mujer lenta (Slow Woman) Premio Juan Gil-Albert 2017

Travel literature 
1996   Bruselas (Brussels)

1998   China para hipocondríacos (China for Hypochondriacs)

Theatre 
2008   Los políticos (The Politicians)

2008   La plaga (The Plague)

2017   ¡Qué raros son los hombres! (Men Are So Strange!)

Short stories
1996   Cuentos para salvarnos todos (Stories to Save Us All)

2000   ¡Qué raros son los hombres! (Men Are So Strange!)

2004   Mujeres que viajan solas (Women Travelling on Their Own)

2008   El príncipe es un sapo. Y viceversa (The Prince is a Toad. And Vice Versa)

2018   Mundo extraño (Strange World) Premio Setenil 2018

Essays 
2011   Escritores delincuentes (Criminal Writers)

2012   La ética de la crueldad (The Ethics of Cruelty) Premio Anagrama de Ensayo

Translations into English 
2013   Nothing Ever Happens, translated by Philip H.D. Smith & Graziella de Luis, Hispabooks 

2017   Inventing love, translated by Simon Deefholts & Kathryn Phillips-Miles, Peter Owen Publishers

References

External links
 https://joseovejero.com/
 http://www.elpais.com/tag/jose_ovejero/a
 https://www.peterowen.com/jose-ovejero-memories-of-madrid/
 http://www.eurolitnetwork.com/from-inventing-love-by-jose-ovejero-translated-by-kathryn-phillips-miles-and-simon-deefholts

Spanish novelists
Spanish male novelists
1958 births
Writers from Madrid
Living people